Joseph Donald Keener (born April 21, 1953) is a former Major League Baseball pitcher.

External links
, or Retrosheet

1953 births
Living people
Águilas del Zulia players
American expatriate baseball players in Canada
Antelope Valley College alumni
Antelope Valley Marauders baseball players
Baseball players from California
Denver Bears players
Georgia Tech alumni
Georgia Tech Yellow Jackets baseball players
Jamestown Expos players
Major League Baseball pitchers
Memphis Blues players
Montreal Expos players
People from San Pedro, Los Angeles
Québec Carnavals players
Tigres de Aragua players
American expatriate baseball players in Venezuela
West Palm Beach Expos players